Maren Elizabeth Seidler (born June 11, 1951 in Brooklyn, New York) is a retired American track and field athlete.  She dominated the shot put from the mid 1960s through 1980.  She won the event at the USA Outdoor Track and Field Championships eleven times starting in 1967, including nine in a row from 1972 to 1980.  She was the American champion indoors nine times, 1968-9, 1972, 1974-5 and 1977 to 1980.  She won her event at the United States Olympic Trials four straight times 1968-1980, a feat only equalled by only one woman, Madeline Manning, Edwin Moses is the only man to achieve four.  Jackie Joyner Kersee is the only woman who has won more events at the Olympic Trials, split between the long jump and heptathlon.  She competed in the Olympics three times, making the final twice.  Her 1980 selection was quashed by the 1980 Summer Olympics boycott. Seidler did however receive one of 461 Congressional Gold Medals created especially for the spurned athletes.

Seidler spent most of her career competing for the Mayor Daley Youth Foundation team.  She started throwing for Tufts University, winning the 1971 DGWS collegiate shot put title. Her back-to-back title in 1972 came while she was competing for California State University, Hayward, where she still holds the school record.  She competed at the 1973 World University Games.  Toward the end of her career, she joined a group of elite male throwers who congregated near San Jose, California called the San Jose Stars.

She also competed in three editions of the Pan American Games, winning a silver medal in 1979.  She was elected into the National Track and Field Hall of Fame in 2000.

References

1951 births
Living people
Sportspeople from Brooklyn
American female shot putters
Olympic track and field athletes of the United States
Athletes (track and field) at the 1968 Summer Olympics
Athletes (track and field) at the 1972 Summer Olympics
Athletes (track and field) at the 1976 Summer Olympics
Pan American Games medalists in athletics (track and field)
Athletes (track and field) at the 1967 Pan American Games
Athletes (track and field) at the 1975 Pan American Games
Athletes (track and field) at the 1979 Pan American Games
Pan American Games silver medalists for the United States
Congressional Gold Medal recipients
Medalists at the 1979 Pan American Games
Track and field athletes from New York City
21st-century American women